This article is a list of notable people from Metro Manila, the capital region of the Philippines. The demonym of Metro Manila is "Metro Manileño" or simply "Manileño."

Architecture and urban planning
 Pablo Antonio (1901–1975): Filipino architect and National Artist. (Binondo)
 Arcadio Arellano (1872–1920): Filipino architect. (Tondo)
 Juan M. Arellano (1888–1960): Filipino architect. (Tondo)
 Edilberto Evangelista (1862–1897): Filipino civil engineer. (Santa Cruz)
 Francisco Mañosa (1931–2019): Filipino architect. (Muntinlupa)
 Tomás Mapúa (1888–1965): Filipino architect. (Binondo)
 Juan Nakpil (1899–1986): Filipino architect and National Artist. (Quiapo)
 Ildefonso P. Santos, Jr. (1929–2014): Filipino National Artist. (Malabon)
 José María Zaragoza (1912–1994): Filipino architect and National Artist. (Quiapo)

Fashion
 Pitoy Moreno (1925–2018): Filipino fashion designer. (Manila)
 Josie Natori (1947): Filipino American fashion designer. (Manila)
 Kermit Tesoro (1988): Filipino accessories and fashion designer. (Manila)

Finances
 Jorge L. Araneta (1936): Filipino businessman. (Manila)
 Betty Go Belmonte (1933–1994): Filipina newspaper publisher. (Santa Mesa)
 Antonio Cabangon-Chua (1934–2016): Filipino businessman and media magnate. (Manila)
 Engracia Cruz-Reyes (1892–1975): Filipino chef and entrepreneur. (Navotas)
 Felipe Gozon (1939): Filipino lawyer and media executive. (Ermita)
 Ramon Jacinto (1945): Filipino business tycoon and musician. (Pasay)
 Eugenio Lopez III (1952): Filipino businessman and media baron. (Manila)
 Ma Mon Luk (1896–1961): Chinese restaurateur. (Binondo)
 Román Ongpin (1847–1912): Filipino Chinese businessman and philanthropist. (Binondo)
 Manuel V. Pangilinan (1946): Filipino businessman and sports patron. (Manila)
 Chick Parsons (1902–1988): American businessman, diplomat and war veteran. (Manila)
 Enrique K. Razon (1960): Spanish Filipino businessman and casino mogul. (Manila)
 Chino Roces (1913–1988): Filipino businessman and media tycoon. (San Miguel)
 Leonardo S. Sarao (1921–2001): Filipino businessman and founder of Sarao Motors. (Las Piñas)
 Andrés Soriano (1898–1964): Spanish Filipino businessman and chief executive of San Miguel Brewery. (San Miguel)
 Andrés Soriano Jr. (1926–1984): Spanish Filipino businessman. (San Miguel)
 Washington SyCip (1921–2017): Chinese Filipino accountant and business executive. (Makati)
 Andrew Tan (1952): Filipino Chinese tycoon. (Manila)
 Manny Villar (1949): Filipino businessman and politician. (Tondo)
 Fernando Zóbel de Ayala y Montojo (1924–1984): Spanish Filipino painter and businessman. (Ermita)
 Jaime Augusto Zobel de Ayala (1959): Spanish Filipino businessman. (Manila)

Independence activists
 Melchora Aquino (1812–1919): Filipina revolutionary. (Caloocan)
 Andrés Bonifacio (1863–1897): Filipino revolutionary. (Tondo)
 Gregoria de Jesús (1875–1943): Filipina revolutionary. (Caloocan)
 Antonio Luna (1866–1899): Filipino revolutionary general. (San Nicolas)
 Andrés Novales (1800–1823): Spanish Army captain who led a revolt against Spanish colonial authorities. (Manila)
 Pío del Pilar (1860–1931): Filipino revolutionary general. (Makati)
 Pío Valenzuela (1869–1956): Filipino physician and patriot. (Valenzuela)

Literature
 Juan Abad (1872–1932): Filipino playwright and journalist. (Sampaloc)
 Rosauro Almario (1886–1933): Filipino essayist and journalist. (Tondo)
 Cecilio Apóstol (1877–1938): Filipino poet. (Santa Cruz)
 Francisco Arcellana (1916–2002): Filipino writer and National Artist (Manila)
 Jesús Balmori (1887–1948): Filipino poet. (Ermita)
 Cirilo Bautista (1941–2018): Filipino poet and National Artist. (Sampaloc)
 Lualhati Bautista (1945): Filipina novelist. (Tondo)
 Amelia Lapeña Bonifacio (1930): Filipina playwright, educator and National Artist. (Binondo)
 Fernando María Guerrero (1873–1929): Filipino writer and politician. (Ermita)
 León María Guerrero III (1915–1982): Filipino novelist and diplomat. (Ermita)
 Wilfrido Ma. Guerrero (1911–1995): Filipino playwright and National Artist. (Ermita)
 Amado V. Hernandez (1903–1970): Filipino writer, labor leader and National Artist. (Tondo)
 José Corazón de Jesús (1896–1932): Filipino poet. (Santa Cruz)
 Nick Joaquin (1917–2004): Filipino writer and historian. (Paco)
 Patricio Mariano (1877–1935): Filipino playwright and revolutionary. (Santa Cruz)
 José Palma (1876–1903): Filipino poet. (Tondo)
 Trinidad Pardo de Tavera (1857–1925): Spanish Filipino historian. (Intramuros)
 Iñigo Ed. Regalado (1888–1974): Filipino poet, novelist and journalist. (Sampaloc)
 Severino Reyes (1861–1942): Filipino writer and playwright. (Santa Cruz)
 Alejandro Roces (1924–2011): Filipino author and National Artist. (San Miguel)
 Bienvenido Santos (1911–1996): Filipino American writer. (Tondo)
 Lope K. Santos (1879–1963): Filipino language writer. (Pasig)
 Rolando Tinio (1937–1997): Filipino poet, playwright and National Artist. (Tondo)
 Jose Garcia Villa (1908–1997): Filipino American poet and National Artist. (Malate)

Media and entertainment
 Alvin Anson (1945): Filipino actor and producer. (Metro Manila)
 Arjo Atayde (1991): Filipino actor. (Manila)
 Ria Atayde (1992): Filipina actress. (Mandaluyong)
 Christine Jacob (1967): Filipina newscaster. (Manila)
 Ogie Diaz (1970): Filipino comedian. (Quezon City)
 Romnick Sarmenta (1972): Filipino actor. (Quezon City)
 Janine Gutierrez (1989): Filipina actress. (Quezon City)
 Arnell Ignacio (1964): Filipino actor and host. (Metro Manila)
 Lovi Poe (1989): Filipina singer actress and model. (Quezon City)
 Alex Medina (1986): Filipino actor. (Manila)
 L.J. Reyes (1987): Filipna actress. (Quezon City)
 Albert Martinez (1961): Filipino actor. (Manila)
 Agot Isidro (1966): Filipina actress. (Marikina)
 William Martinez (1962): Filipino film actor. (Manila)
 Sheryl Cruz (1974): Filipina actress. (Makati)
 Rommel Padilla (1965): Filipino actor. (Manila)
 Bela Padilla (1991): Filipina actress. (Makati)
 Michael De Mesa (1960): Filipino dramatic actor. (Manila)
 Lani Mercado (1968): Filipina actress. (Manila)
 Jolo Revilla (1988): Filipino actor. (Quezon City)
 Donny Pangilinan (1998): Filipino actor. (Metro Manila)
 kris Bernal (1989): Filipina actress.(Quezon City)
 Lino Cayetano (1978): Filipino film director. (Taguig)
 Christine Bersola-Babao (1970): Filipina journalist. (Manila)
 Robi Domingo (1989): Filipino TV host. (Quezon City)
 Kitkat (1988): Freelancer comedian. (Manila)
 Dingdong Dantes (1980): Filipino actor. (Quezon City)
 Jolina Magdangal (1978): Filipina momsie tv host. (Quezon City)
 Paolo Contis (1984): Filipino actor. (Manila)
 Rhian Ramos (1990): Filipina actress. (Makati)
 Tonton Gutierrez (1964): Filipino actor. (Manila)
 Toni Rose Gayda (1958): Filipina actress. (Manila)
 Coco Martin (1981): Filipino action actor. (Sampaloc)
 Janice De Belen (1968): Filipina actress and TV host judge. (Quezon City)
 Herbert Bautista (1968): Filipino actor. (Quezon City)
 Tuesday Vargas (1980): Filipina actress and comedian. (Sampaloc)
 John Estrada (1973): Filipino actor and comedian. (Quezon City)
 Julia Barretto (1997): Filipina actress. (Marikina)
 Marvin Agustin (1979): Filipino actor and businessman. (Manila)
 Tim Yap (1977): TV showbiz host. (Metro Manila)
 Ciara Sotto (1980): Actress and singer. (Makati)
 Dennis Trillo (1981): Actor and Filipino endoser. (Quezon City)
 Judy Ann Santos (1978): Filipina actress. (Manila)
 Ryan Agoncillo (1979): Filipino actor. (Santa Mesa)
 Sunshine Dizon (1983): Filipina actress. (Quezon City)
 Carlo Aquino (1985): Filipino famous actor, film movie and singer. (Quezon City)
 Tirso Cruz III (1952): Filipino veteran famous actor. (Sampaloc)
 John Prats (1984): Filipino famous actor and TV director. (Manila)
 Daniel Padilla (1995): Filipino famous actor. (Manila)
 Vice Ganda (1976): Filipino famous comedian. (Tondo)
 Joem Bascon (1986): Filipino actor. (Mandaluyong)
 Kim Molina (1991): Filipina actress. (Manila)
 Doris Bigornia (1966): Filipina journalist. (Metro Manila)
Gardo Versoza (1964): Filipino actor. (Manila)
Richard Gomez (1966): Filipino actor.  (Manila) 
JMKO (1994): Filipino singer. (Manila)
Joey De Leon (1946): Filipino comedian host. (Binondo)
Hajji Alejandro (1954): Filipino singer. (Manila)
Rachel Alejandro (1974): Filipina singer. (Manila)
Dianne Medina (1986): Filipina showbiz news anchor. (Manila)
Manny Jacinto (1987): Filipino Canadian actor. (Manila)
Oyo Boy Sotto (1984): Filipino comedian. (Manila)
Rory Quintos (1962): Filipino director film, actor. (Manila)
 Panchito Alba (1925–1995): Filipino comedian. (Paco)
 Ishmael Bernal (1938–1996): Filipino film director and National Artist. (Manila)
Camille Prats (1985): Filipina actress, tv host and comedian. (Manila)
Dolphy (1928–2012): Filipino comedian. (Tondo)
 Rachel Grant (1977): Filipino British actress. (Parañaque)
 Gerardo de León (1913–1981): Filipino film director and National Artist. (Manila)
 Lisa Macuja-Elizalde (1964): Filipina prima ballerina. (Manila)
 Stella Márquez (1937): Colombian director and beauty queen. (Quezon City)
 Lily Monteverde (1938): Filipina film producer and businesswoman. (Manila)
 José Nepomuceno (1893–1959): Filipino film director and producer. (Manila)
 Fernando Poe Jr. (1939–2004): Filipino actor and National Artist. (Manila)
 Isabel Preysler (1951): Spanish Filipino socialite, model and host. (Manila)
 Roberto Villanueva (1971): Spanish Filipino dancer, choreographer, and producer. (Manila)
Luchi Cruz-Valdez (1965): Filipina journalist. (Manila)

Military
 Frederick Walker Castle (1908–1944): U.S. Army general and Medal of Honor recipient. (Taguig)
 Rafael Crame (1863–1927): Filipino constabulary chief. (Malabon)
 George Fleming Davis (1911–1945): US Navy officer and Medal of Honor recipient. (Manila)
 José Olaguer Feliú (1857–1929): Spanish lieutenant general and war minister. (Manila)

Music
 Aicelle Santos (1985): Filipina singer. (Manila)
 Gian Sotto (1978): Band vocalist. (Quezon City)
 Lindsay Custodio (1978): Filipina opm singer. (Quezon City)
 JM Yosures  (1996): Filipino pop opm singer. (Quezon City)
 L.A. Lopez  (1985): OPM singer and composer. (Quezon City)
 Kyla (1981): Filipina Singer. (Manila)
 Erik Santos (1982): Filipino opm ballad singer. (Malabon)
 Angeline Quinto (1989): Filipina opm singer. (Sampaloc)
 Martin Nievera (1962): Filipino American singer. (Manila)
 kitchie Nadal (1980): Filipina opm rock singer. (Manila)
 Yael Yuzon (1983): Vocalist of sponge cola band. (Manila)
 Zsa Zsa Padilla (1964): Filipina famous singer the divine diva. (Manila)
 Paco Arespacochaga (1971): OPM vocalist. (Manila)
Marion Aunor (1992): Filipina singer. (Manila)
G3 Misa (1972): OPM band. (Manila)
Elise Estrada (1987): Filipina Canadian R&B singer. (Marikina)
Ramon Jacinto (1945): Filipino singer; guitarist artist, disc jockey and radio tv industry businessman person. (Pasay)
Tina Paner (1971): Filipina opm singer. (Manila)
Jaime Rivera (1966): Inspirational diva. (Manila)
Luis Eduardo Aute (1943): Spanish musician. (Manila)
 Danita Paner (1989): Filipina pop rock singer. (Mamila)
Antonio Barretto Morales (1943–2014): Spanish Filipino singer. (Manila)
 Ladislao Bonus (1854–1908): Filipino musician and opera composer. (Pandacan)
 Donna Cruz (1977): Filipina opm singer. (Manila)
 Ryan Cayabyab (1954): Filipino composer, conductor and National Artist. (Santa Cruz)
 klarisse De Guzman (1991): Filipina opm soul diva singer. (Makati)
 Levi Celerio (1910–2002): Filipino composer, lyricist and National Artist. (Tondo)
 Fred Elizalde (1907–1979): Spanish Filipino pianist and composer. (Manila)
 José Maceda (1917–2004): Filipino composer,  ethnomusicologist and National Artist. (Manila)
 Antonio Molina (1894–1980): Filipino composer and National Artist. (Quiapo)
 Julio Nakpil (1867–1960): Filipino musician and revolutionary general. (Quiapo)
 Dolores Paterno (1854–1881): Filipina composer. (Santa Cruz)
 Arnel Pineda (1967): Filipino singer and songwriter. (Tondo)
 Atang de la Rama (1902–1991): Filipina singer, actress and National Artist. (Pandacan)
 Josephine Roberto (1977): Filipino American singer. (Pasay)
 Lea Salonga (1971): Filipina singer. (Ermita)
 Ramon Santos (1941): Filipino composer and National Artist. (Pasig)
 Camile Velasco (1985): Filipino American singer. (Makati)
 Andrea Veneracion (1928–2013): Filipina conductor and National Artist. (Manila)

Natural sciences
 León María Guerrero (1853–1935): Filipino botanist and patriot. (Ermita)
 Richard F. Heck (1931–2015): American chemist and Nobel Prize winner. (Quezon City)
 Fe del Mundo (1911–2011): Filipina pediatrician and National Scientist. (Intramuros)
 Manuel A. Zamora (1870–1929): Filipino chemist and pharmacist. (Santa Cruz)

Politics
 Gregorio S. Araneta (1869–1930): Filipino lawyer and Philippine Commission member. (Quiapo)
 Marcelo Azcárraga Palmero (1832–1915): Spanish prime minister. (Manila)
 Benjamin Abalos Jr. (1962): Filipino politician and lawyer. (Mandaluyong)
 Joaquín Miguel Elizalde (1896–1965): Filipino statesman and International Monetary Fund governor. (Manila)
 Joseph Estrada, former president of the Philippines and mayor of the city of Manila. (Tondo)
 Miguel Lino de Ezpeleta: Spanish Governor-General of the Philippines. (Manila)
 Benito Legarda (1853–1915): Filipino legislator and Philippine Commission member. (Quiapo)
 Bongbong Marcos (1957): former senate filipino politician and famous candidate for filipino general presidencial election. ( Manila)
 Imelda Marcos (1929): former first lady of the Philippines and governor of Metro Manila. (Pandacan)
 Tomás Morató (1887–1965): Spanish politician and businessman. (Quezon City)
 Esperanza Osmeña (1894–1978): former first lady of the Philippines. (San Miguel)
 Pedro Paterno (1857–1911): Filipino prime minister. (Santa Cruz)
 Teodoro Sandiko (1860–1939): Filipino senator and revolutionary. (Pandacan)
 Jejomar Binay (1942): former vice president of the Philippines. (Paco)
 Benigno Aquino III (1960-2021): former president of the Philippines (2010-2016). (Sampaloc)

Religion
 Francisca del Espíritu Santo Fuentes (1647–1711): Spanish religious figure. (Manila)
 Ignacia del Espíritu Santo (1663–1748): Filipina venerable. (Binondo)
 Mariano Gomez (1799–1872): Executed Filipino secular priest. (Santa Cruz)
 José María of Manila (1880–1936): Spanish blessed. (Manila)
 Isabel Larrañaga Ramírez (1836–1899): Spanish venerable. (Manila)
 Vicente Liem de la Paz (1732–1773): Vietnamese saint. (Manila)
 Felix Manalo (1886–1963): Filipino religious leader and founder of Iglesia ni Cristo. (Taguig)
 Darwin Ramos (1994–2012): Filipino candidate to the sainthood. (Pasay)
 Lorenzo Ruiz (1600–1637): Filipino saint. (Binondo)
 Jacinto Zamora (1835–1872): Executed Filipino secular priest. (Pandacan)
 Nicolas Zamora (1875–1914): Filipino religious leader and founder of Iglesia Evangelica Metodista en las Islas Filipinas. (Binondo)

Social sciences
 Carmen Guerrero Nakpil (1922): Filipina historian and journalist. (Ermita)
 Epifanio de los Santos (1871–1928): Filipino historian. (Malabon)

Sports
 Fernando Giménez Álvarez (1925–2013): Spanish Filipino American footballer, sports executive and referee. (Manila)
 Felicisimo Ampon (1920–1997): Filipino tennis player. (Manila)
 EJ Obiena (1995): Filipino track and field. (Tondo)
 Carlos Badion (1935–2002): Filipino basketball player. (Tondo)
 Oliver Barbosa (1986): Filipino chess grandmaster. (Pasig)
 Charles Borck (1917–2008): German Spanish Filipino basketball player. (Quiapo)
 Allan Caidic (1963): Filipino basketball player. (Pasig)
 Dionisio Calvo (1903–1977): Filipino basketball player. (Sampaloc)
 Luisito Espinosa (1967): Filipino boxer. (Tondo)
 Danny Florencio (1947–2018): Filipino basketball player. (Quiapo)
 Jayson Gonzales (1969): Filipino chess grandmaster. (Quezon City)
 Daniel Guda (1996): Australian badminton player. (Manila)
 Nikko Huelgas (1991): Filipino triathlete. (Las Piñas)
 Samboy Lim (1962): Filipino basketball player. (Manila)
 Carlos Loyzaga (1930–2016): Filipino basketball player. (San Juan)
 Peter Gabriel Magnaye (1992): Filipino badminton player. (Manila)
 Marlon Manalo (1975): Filipino pool player. (Mandaluyong)
 Michael Christian Martinez (1996): Filipino figure skater. (Parañaque)
 Paeng Nepomuceno (1957): Filipino bowler. (Quezon City)
 Ambrosio Padilla (1910–1996): Filipino basketball player and senator. (San Miguel)
 Franz Pumaren (1963): Filipino basketball player and politician. (Quezon City)
 Alberto Reynoso (1940–2011): Filipino basketball player. (Pasig)
 Biboy Rivera (1974): Filipino bowler. (Quezon City)
 Marlon Stöckinger (1991): Filipino racing driver. (Manila)
 Tim Tebow (1987): American baseball player. (Makati)
 Eduardo Teus (1896–1958): Filipino Spanish footballer. (Manila)
 Carlos Yulo (2000): Filipino artistic gymnast. (Malate)

Visual arts
 Federico Aguilar Alcuaz (1932–2011): Filipino painter, sculptor and National Artist. (Santa Cruz)
 Fernando Amorsolo (1892–1972): Filipino painter and National Artist. (Paco)
 Antonio Blanco (1912–1999): Indonesian painter. (Ermita)
 Benedicto Cabrera (1942): Filipino painter and National Artist. (Malabon)
 Eduardo Castrillo (1942): Filipino sculptor. (Santa Ana)
 Francisco Coching (1919–1998): Filipino illustrator, writer and National Artist. (Pasig)
 Bonifacio Flores Arevalo (1850–1920): Filipino sculptor and ilustrado. (Quiapo)
 Félix Resurrección Hidalgo (1855–1913): Filipino painter. (Binondo)
 Cesar Legaspi (1917–1994): Filipino painter and National Artist. (Tondo)
 Pelagia Mendoza y Gotianquin (1867–1939): Filipina sculptor. (Pateros)
 Hernando R. Ocampo (1911–1978): Filipino modernist painter and National Artist. (Santa Cruz)
 Alfonso A. Ossorio (1916–1990): Filipino American painter. (Manila)
 Fabián de la Rosa (1869–1937): Filipino painter. (Paco)

See also
 List of people from Manila

 
People from Metro Manila
Metro Manila